Gwilym Meirion Jenkins (12 August 1932 – 10 July 1982) was a British statistician and systems engineer, born in Gowerton, Swansea, Wales. He is most notable for his pioneering work with George Box on autoregressive moving average models, also called Box–Jenkins models, in time-series analysis.

He earned a first class honours degree in mathematics in 1953 followed by a PhD at University College London in 1956. After graduating, he married Margaret Bellingham and together they raised three children. His first job after university was junior fellow at the Royal Aircraft Establishment. He followed this by a series of visiting lecturer and professor positions at Imperial College London, Stanford University, Princeton University, and the University of Wisconsin–Madison, before settling in as a professor of Systems Engineering at Lancaster University in 1965. His initial work concerned discrete time domain models for chemical engineering applications.

While at Lancaster, he founded and became managing director of ISCOL (International Systems Corporation of Lancaster). He remained in academia until 1974, when he left to start his own consulting company.

He served on the Research Section Committee and Council of the Royal Statistical Society in the 1960s, founded the Journal of Systems Engineering in 1969, and briefly carried out public duties with the Royal Treasury in the mid-1970s. He was elected to the Institute of Mathematical Statistics and the Institute of Statisticians.

He was a jazz and blues enthusiast and an accomplished pianist.

He died from Hodgkin's lymphoma in 1982.

Books by G. M. Jenkins
 Spectral analysis and its applications (with D. G. Watts) 1968
 Time Series Analysis: Forecasting and Control (with G. E. P. Box and Gregory C. Reinsel) 2008
 Practical experience with modelling and forecasting time series 1979
 Case studies in time series analysis (with G. McLeod) 1983

Obituary
 G. E. P. Box (1983) G. M. Jenkins, 1933-1982 Journal of the Royal Statistical Society. Series A (General), Vol. 146, No. 2, pp. 205–206.

References

External links
 George Box's Interview for the International Journal of Forecasting
 
 Biography of Gwilym M. Jenkins from the Institute for Operations Research and the Management Sciences

1933 births
1982 deaths
People from Swansea
Alumni of University College London
Welsh statisticians
Deaths from Hodgkin lymphoma
Systems engineers
Academics of Lancaster University
20th-century British mathematicians